Taibaiella koreensis is a Gram-negative, rod-shaped, strictly aerobic, non-spore-forming and non-motile bacterium from the genus of Taibaiella which has been isolated from soil from a ginseng field from Pocheon in Korea.

References

Chitinophagia
Bacteria described in 2014